Qaderabad (also Romanized as Qāderābād) is a village in Akhtachi Rural District, in the Central District of Bukan County, West Azerbaijan Province, Iran. At the 2006 census, its population was 118, in 20 families.

References 

Populated places in Bukan County